Michael "Elvis" Baskette is an American music producer who has worked with artists such as Sevendust, Alter Bridge, Projected, Tremonti, Chevelle, Limp Bizkit, Falling in Reverse, Coldrain, The Classic Crime, Temple Agents, Clint Lowery and Slash.

Selected discography

References 

Living people
American record producers
1976 births